These are the official results of the Women's 200 metres event at the 1991 IAAF World Championships in Tokyo, Japan. There were a total number of 38 participating athletes, with five qualifying heats and the final held on Friday August 30, 1991.

Medalists

Schedule
All times are Japan Standard Time (UTC+9)

Final

Semifinals
Held on Friday 1991-08-30

Quarterfinals
Held on Thursday 1991-08-29

Qualifying heats
Held on Thursday 1991-08-29

See also
 1987 Women's World Championships 200 metres (Rome)
 1988 Women's Olympic 200 metres (Seoul)
 1990 Women's European Championships 200 metres (Split)
 1992 Women's Olympic 200 metres (Barcelona)
 1993 Women's World Championships 200 metres (Stuttgart)

References
 Results

1991 World Championships in Athletics
200 metres at the World Athletics Championships
1991 in women's athletics